Robert Grant Grant-Ferris, Baron Harvington, AE PC (30 December 1907 – 1 January 1997) was a British Conservative Party politician.

Born Robert Grant Ferris, he was educated at Douai School and served in the RAF during the War, receiving the Air Efficiency Award in 1942. He was the son of Mrs. Ellen Ryan Ferris (1870–1955), who is known to have purchased and given Harvington Hall to the Archdiocese of Birmingham in 1923.

In 1930, he married Florence Brennan de Vine (d. 30 December 1996), with whom he had a daughter and a son. He was Member of Parliament (MP) for St Pancras North from 1937 to 1945, and for Nantwich from 1955 until his retirement at the February 1974 general election.  He served as Chairman of Ways and Means and Deputy Speaker from 1970 to 1974. Ferris's maiden speech to Parliament was in March 1937, in a debate on the Air Ministry estimates, in which he spoke as a member of the Royal Auxiliary Air Force.

Grant-Ferris was a staunch supporter of fellow devout Roman Catholic Francisco Franco during the Spanish Civil War.
His son Fr Piers Grant-Ferris (b. April 9, 1933) pleaded guilty at Leeds Crown Court to indecently assaulting 15 boys while teaching at Gilling Castle, North Yorkshire, the preparatory school for nearby Ampleforth College, between 1966 and 1975.
He changed his name from Ferris to Grant-Ferris by deed poll in August 1942.

He was knighted in 1969, and sworn to the Privy Council in 1971. On 24 June 1974 he was given a life peerage as Baron Harvington, of Nantwich in the County of Cheshire.

References

1907 births
1997 deaths
Grant-Ferris
Conservative Party (UK) life peers
Grant-Ferris
English Roman Catholics
Knights Bachelor
Members of the Privy Council of the United Kingdom
People educated at Douai School
Royal Air Force personnel of World War II
Grant-Ferris
Grant-Ferris
Grant-Ferris
Grant-Ferris
Grant-Ferris
Grant-Ferris
UK MPs who were granted peerages
Life peers created by Elizabeth II